Svetlana Leonidovna  Boginskaya (born February 9, 1973) is a former artistic gymnast for the Soviet Union and Belarus of Belarusian origin. She is a three-time Olympic champion, with an individual gold medal on vault from the 1988 Summer Olympics and team gold medals from the 1988 and 1992 Summer Olympics.

Early life and career

Boginskaya was born in Minsk, Belarus. She was a figure skater for several years, but began gymnastics at age six. Two years later, she moved to Moscow to train full-time at the Round Lake Gymnastics Center. By age fourteen, she was a member of the Soviet national team.

She won her first world medal, a bronze on balance beam, at the 1987 World Championships. She went on to compete in the 1988 Olympic Games in Seoul, South Korea, where she won four medals: gold in the team competition, gold on vault, silver on floor, and bronze in the individual all-around.

Just three days after the Olympics, Boginskaya's longtime coach, Lyubov Miromanova, committed suicide. Miromanova had been a surrogate mother to Boginskaya, coaching and caring for her after she moved from Minsk to train full-time in Moscow. After her death, Boginskaya began training with Tatiana Grosovivich. Under Grosovivich's tutelage, Boginskaya became world champion in 1989 and later dedicated her performance to her late mentor.

In 1990, Boginskaya became the fourth woman to sweep the European Championships, winning the gold medal in every individual event. The only other gymnasts to do so were Věra Čáslavská, Ludmilla Tourischeva, and Larisa Latynina.  In doing so, she defended her titles in the all-around, vault, and floor exercise, and added titles in the uneven bars and balance beam. In 1991, in a controversial finish, Boginskaya lost the gold medal in the all-around to Kim Zmeskal of the United States. However, she earned gold medals in the team and balance beam competitions.

In 1992, Boginskaya, then 19 years old, had a disappointing performance at the 1992 European Championships, falling on her final event, the floor exercise. She finished in fifth place, while her young teammate Tatiana Gutsu won the all-around title. Boginskaya won the balance beam title with a score of 9.95 and remained a favorite to win the all-around title at the 1992 Summer Olympics in Barcelona, Spain.

Many in the gymnastics world expected a duel between Boginskaya and Zmeskal at the Olympics, and the media promoted this story. However, while Boginskaya won her third Olympic gold medal in the team competition, she faltered on the uneven bars in the individual all-around and finished fifth; Zmeskal finished tenth. Meanwhile, their younger teammates Tatiana Gutsu and Shannon Miller won the gold and silver medals.

Boginskaya retired after the 1992 Olympics but decided to make a comeback in 1995. She said that she was inspired by Katarina Witt who had made a memorable comeback of her own at the 1994 Winter Olympics. Boginskaya moved to Houston, Texas, to train with Bela Karolyi and upgraded the difficulty of her routines. In 1996, at age 23, she placed second in the all-around at the American Cup to one of Karolyi's pupils, Kerri Strug, as well as at the European Championships in Birmingham, behind the defending world all-around champion (and future Olympic all-around champion), Lilia Podkopayeva of Ukraine. She then progressed to the 1996 Olympics in Atlanta, Georgia, where she was one of a number of older gymnasts competing. She led the Belarus team to sixth place and competed in the all-around and vault finals, but won no individual medals, placing 15th in the all-around and fifth on vault.

Boginskaya is among a small group of women to have competed in three Olympic Games; and due to the  break-up of the Soviet Union, she competed at each Games under a different flag: USSR, the Unified Team, and Belarus. She was inducted into the International Gymnastics Hall of Fame in 2005.

Boginskaya has remained active in both the American and international gymnastics communities, and works as a consulting guest coach. In the early 2010s, she frequently supported former teammate Oksana Chusovitina, who competed well into her 40s and appeared on the competition floor as her coach. Living in Houston with her husband and two children, she runs several businesses, including an online gymnastics apparel retailer, a summer camp for gymnasts, and a pizzeria.

In popular culture
After the 1992 Olympics, Boginskaya appeared alongside her compatriot Vitaly Scherbo in the music video for the song "Revolution Earth," by The B-52's.

Trademarks

Boginskaya's floor routine at the 1988 Olympics was done to the music of Georges Bizet's Carmen, and another routine she performed in parts of 1990 and 1991 was choreographed by the Bolshoi Ballet. Her uneven bars exercise included a signature giant to handstand with 180° split into a toe-on element. Commentators and reporters cited her height and slim stature as elements she used to her advantage through attention to posture and body alignment; meanwhile they also suggested that she relied more on execution and presentation than difficulty, though she did usually fulfill requirements and earn 10.0 start values. She frequently landed dismounts and vaults with her right foot placed slightly in front of her left, an intentional touch of artistry that also helped her stick landings.

Competitive history

See also

 List of top Olympic gymnastics medalists
 List of top medalists at the World Artistic Gymnastics Championships

References

External links
 
 Bio and Competition Results
 

1973 births
Living people
Gymnasts from Minsk
Soviet female artistic gymnasts
Belarusian female artistic gymnasts
Olympic gold medalists for the Soviet Union
Olympic gold medalists for the Unified Team
Olympic silver medalists for the Soviet Union
Olympic bronze medalists for the Soviet Union
Olympic gymnasts of the Soviet Union
Olympic gymnasts of the Unified Team
Olympic gymnasts of Belarus
Olympic medalists in gymnastics
Gymnasts at the 1988 Summer Olympics
Gymnasts at the 1992 Summer Olympics
Gymnasts at the 1996 Summer Olympics
World champion gymnasts
Medalists at the World Artistic Gymnastics Championships
Honoured Masters of Sport of the USSR
Belarusian emigrants to the United States
Medalists at the 1992 Summer Olympics
Medalists at the 1988 Summer Olympics
People with acquired American citizenship
Goodwill Games medalists in gymnastics
Competitors at the 1990 Goodwill Games
European champions in gymnastics